Koh-e Hindukush ( "mountain which attracts the Hindu or Hindu-happy"). It is a mountain of the Hindu Kush in Afghanistan. It is located in Parwan Province.

Koh-e Hindukush lies from northeast to southwest of Afghanistan and divides the Amu Darya valley into northern and southern parts.

The highest peak of Koh-e Hindukush is Mount Tirich Mir, (7,690 meters). near the border with Pakistan.

References 

Mountains of Afghanistan
Four-thousanders of the Hindu Kush
Landforms of Parwan Province